Alfredo Harp Helú (born 1944) is a Mexican businessman of Lebanese origin, and as of 2011, with a net worth of $1.5  billion, is according to Forbes the 974th richest person in the world. He is also the cousin of multibillionaire Carlos Slim.

In 2018, Alfredo Harp Helu ranked #1,867 on the Forbes World's Billionaires list, with wealth listed at US $1.2 billion.

Biography 
Born in Mexico City, Harp is most famous for being the former owner of the biggest Latin American and Mexican bank, Banamex (now part of Citigroup), and was a billion-dollar beneficiary of Citigroup's 2001 buyout of Banamex. He is also owner of the telecommunication company, Avantel, the second largest telephone company in Mexico (now part of Axtel).

On March 23, 2019, the Diablos Rojos del México (Red Devils) opened their new Alfredo Harp Helú baseball stadium in Mexico City.

Personal life
Harp is married, with several children. He and his family with his second wife divide their time between homes in Mexico City and Oaxaca City.

He is a baseball fan, owning wholly or partly two professional baseball teams in Mexico, the Diablos Rojos of Mexico City and the Guerreros of Oaxaca City. In 2012, he became part of the MLB San Diego Padres ownership group.

Kidnapping 
In 1994, Harp's family paid about $30 million after he was held for 106 days by his kidnappers in Mexico City. The release followed a dramatic television appearance in which his son, accompanied by a family lawyer and a priest, accepted the kidnappers' terms unconditionally. At the family's request, the police did not intervene, giving rise to fears that the huge ransom would encourage more kidnappings, and adding to concerns about Mexico's stability. In 1996, authorities claimed to have recovered nearly $10 million of the Harp ransom.

In 2008, Harp attended the funeral of Fernando Martí, 14-year-old son of the founder of a chain of sporting goods stores, who had been kidnapped and murdered, despite his family's payment of a ransom. He also paid for a full-page advertisement in newspapers calling on the government to put a stop to the rising kidnapping phenomenon in Mexico.

Philanthropy 
Harp funds several charitable foundations:
 Fundación Alfredo Harp Helú
 Fundación Alfredo Harp Helú Oaxaca (involved in education, health, culture, and conservation in the state of Oaxaca).

External links
 Timeline 1994 C
 Alfredo Harp Helu personal
 Fundación Alfredo Harp Helú
 Fundación Alfredo Harp Helú Oaxaca

References 

  The New York Times - Family of Kidnapped Mexican Financier Agrees to Ransom (June 1994)
  Time - No Help for Mexico's Kidnapping Surge (August 2008)
  BBC - Mexican fury grows at kidnappings (August 2008)

1944 births
Living people
Mexican billionaires
Mexican people of Lebanese descent
Businesspeople from Mexico City
Lebanese businesspeople